Meyami Rural District may refer to:
 Meyami Rural District (Razavi Khorasan Province)
 Meyami Rural District (Semnan Province)